The Federal Service for Surveillance on Consumer Rights Protection and Human Wellbeing or Rospotrebnadzor is the federal service responsible for the supervision of consumer rights protection and human wellbeing in Russia. This service was founded in 2004, and was included in the structure of the Ministry of Health Care of Russia until 2012. In May 2012 Rospotrebnadzor was removed from the supervision of the Ministry of Health and now reports directly to the Russian Government. It functions on the authority of the Act of Federal Service on the base of the Administrative Regulation.

History
The organization's history goes back to the Decree of the Council of People's Commissars of the RSFSR "On the Sanitary Authorities of the Republic" dated 15 September 1922.
 
As of 2004, 2,218 separate sanitary-epidemiological stations (centers) were open in Russia.
 
It initially reported to the Ministry of Health. By 2004, the Rospotrebnadzor was under the direct oversight of the Government of Russia.  
 
From 2004 until October 2013, it was headed by Gennady Onishchenko. The current head of the Rospotrebnadzor is Anna Popova. 
 
The service currently employs approximately 110,000 professionals in its various bodies and organizations.

Responsibilities

The Rospotrebnadzor is responsible for performing the following functions:

 sanitary control and issuing permissive documents;
 licensing of certain kinds of activities;
 certification of different objects of evaluating of conformity to Russian legislation.
 sanitary certification of production according to the requirements of the Customs Union;
 state registration of production of the RF (excepting medicaments);
 state registration of production of the Customs Union on the territory of Russia (with the exception of pharmaceuticals).

References

 GOST standards
 The International Portal about Procedure of Product Certification in Russia
 The Official Department of the Rostest Certification Center in St. Petersburg
 The Official Department of the Rostest Certification Center in Stockholm
 The International Portal about Russian Documentation required for Importing goods into Russia
 The International Portal about Procedure of Russian Certification
 Current information about the products whose subject under the Expert Conclusion

External links
 

2004 establishments in Russia
Consumer protection law
Government agencies established in 2004
Government agencies of Russia
National public health agencies
Consumer rights agencies